Elections in Wisconsin are held to fill various local, state and federal seats. Special elections may be held to fill vacancies at other points in time. 

In a 2020 study, Wisconsin was ranked as the 25th easiest state for citizens to vote in.

Presidential

United States presidential election in Wisconsin, 1980
United States presidential election in Wisconsin, 1984
United States presidential election in Wisconsin, 1988
United States presidential election in Wisconsin, 1992
United States presidential election in Wisconsin, 1996
United States presidential election in Wisconsin, 2000
United States presidential election in Wisconsin, 2004
United States presidential election in Wisconsin, 2008
Wisconsin Democratic primary, 2008
Wisconsin Republican primary, 2008
United States presidential election in Wisconsin, 2012
Wisconsin Republican primary, 2012
United States presidential election in Wisconsin, 2016
 2020 United States presidential election in Wisconsin

National legislative

U.S. Senate
United States Senate election in Wisconsin, 2012

U.S. House of Representatives
United States House of Representatives elections in Wisconsin, 2008
United States House of Representatives elections in Wisconsin, 2012
 2020 United States House of Representatives elections in Wisconsin

State executive
2022 gubernatorial election
2018 gubernatorial election
2014 gubernatorial election
2012 gubernatorial recall election
2010 gubernatorial election
2006 gubernatorial election
Wisconsin gubernatorial election, 1998 and previous years

State legislative
Wisconsin state elections, 2008
 2020 Wisconsin elections

See also
Political party strength in Wisconsin
Recall elections in Wisconsin
Wisconsin Government Accountability Board
Women's suffrage in Wisconsin

References

Further reading

External links
Elections Division at the Wisconsin Government Accountability Board

 
  (State affiliate of the U.S. League of Women Voters)
 Digital Public Library of America. Assorted materials related to Wisconsin elections 
 

 
Government of Wisconsin
Political events in Wisconsin